The 2015 FC Barcelona presidential election was the thirteenth FC Barcelona presidential election, held on Saturday, July 18, 2015. The interim president Josep Maria Bartomeu's candidacy got re-elected by defeating the three other main challengers: Joan Laporta, former President of the club, Toni Freixa, a former executive, and Agustí Benedito, an entrepreneur. The voters of the election were the 109,637 FC Barcelona socis (members) at the Camp Nou, who voted through a universal suffrage system and elected their new president for 6 years. The final turnout was 43,12%, a decrease of a 5% since the last election.

Electoral calendar 
The electoral calendar was the following:
 June 11: Election called
 June 24-26: Census collected
 June 29 - July 4: Candidacy announcements and signatures
 July 6-8: Proclamation of the valid candidacies
 July 9-16: Electoral campaign
 July 17: Election silence
 July 18: Election

Candidacies 
There were 7 pre-candidacies: Josep Maria Bartomeu, Agustí Benedito, Jordi Farré, Toni Freixa, Joan Laporta, Jordi Majó, and Joan Batiste. Even when the club has more than 140,000 members, the only people who could vote were the 109,637 members who had the age to do so. Each candidate had to get 2,534 butlletes de suport (support tickets) before July 4th. As the day arrived, Josep Maria Bartomeu, Joan Laporta, Toni Freixa and Agustí Benedito were able to collect the tickets, effectively making them formal and official candidates to the presidency.

Results 
With the final participation of 47,270 socis (43,12% of the census), Josep Maria Bartomeu got 25,823 votes (54,63%) and won the election, Joan Laporta got 15,615 votes (33,03%), and finally Agustí Benedito with 3,386 votes (7,16%) and Toni Freixa with 1,750 votes (3,70%).

See also 
 FC Barcelona
 History of FC Barcelona
 List of FC Barcelona presidents
 La Liga
 Football in Spain

References 

FC Barcelona
2015 in Catalonia
Barcelona